Kwan Soon Teck (born 1920s in Negeri Sembilan) is a former Negeri Sembilan FA and Malaya player.

Career overview
A Striker, Soon Teck was a squad player for Negeri Sembilan that captured the 1948 Malaya Cup editions.

References

Malaysian footballers
1920 births
People from Negeri Sembilan
Association football forwards
Negeri Sembilan FA players